Willie Lewis (21 May 1884 – 18 May 1949) was a professional American boxer from New York. His career spanned from 1901 to 1915. He was best known in the United States and France where In early 1910, Lewis made an unsuccessful bid at the world middleweight title losing to Billy Papke and made two unsuccessful attempts at the World welterweight title, controversially drawing against World welterweight Champion Harry Lewis (no relation) twice in Paris. In 1913 Lewis' heavyweight hunting gun exploded, damaging his leg. In 1920, Lewis was shot in an ambush attack and seriously wounded in his Cafe in New York.

Lewis died of cancer 18 May 1949.

| style="text-align:center;" colspan="8"|Notable bouts
|-  style="text-align:center; background:#e3e3e3;"
|  style="border-style:none none solid solid; "|Res.
|  style="border-style:none none solid solid; "|Record
|  style="border-style:none none solid solid; "|Opponent
|  style="border-style:none none solid solid; "|Type
|  style="border-style:none none solid solid; "|Round
|  style="border-style:none none solid solid; "|Date
|  style="border-style:none none solid solid; "|Location
|  style="border-style:none none solid solid; "|Notes
|- align=center
|Loss
|85-22-10
|align=left|
|
|
|
|align=left|
|align=left|
|- align=center
|style="background:#abcdef;"|Draw
|74-11-08
|align=left|
|
|
|
|align=left|
|align=left|
|- align=center
|style="background:#abcdef;"|Draw
|74-10-07
|align=left|
|
|
|
|align=left|
|align=left|
|- align=center
|win
|68-09-07
|align=left|
|
|
|
|align=left|
|align=left|
|- align=center
|win
|49-9-07
|align=left|
|
|
|
|align=left|
|align=left|

References

External links 

American male boxers
Welterweight boxers
Middleweight boxers
1884 births
1949 deaths
Boxers from New York (state)
American victims of crime